= NGC 7506 =

Galaxy in the constellation Pisces

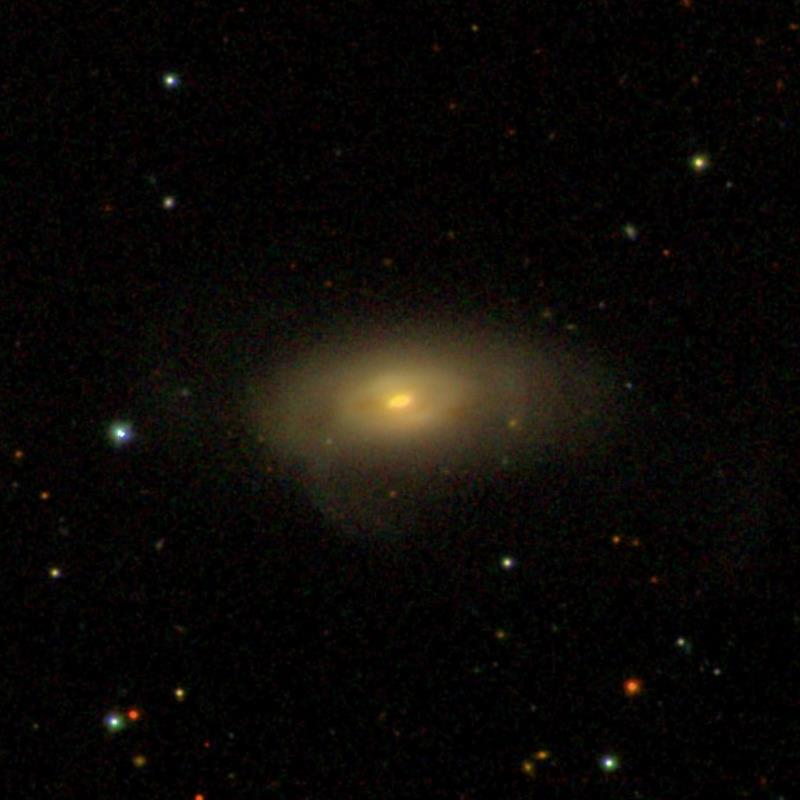
- SDSS image of NGC 7506

Observation data
- Constellation: Pisces
- Right ascension: 23^{h} 13^{m} 01^{s}
- Declination: −02° 01′ 06″

NGC 7506 is a lenticular galaxy located about 173 million light-years away from Earth in the constellation of Pisces. It was discovered on September 20, 1784 by the astronomer William Herschel.
